Vasilios Papadimitriou (born 21 May 1948) is a Greek athlete. He competed in the men's high jump at the 1972 Summer Olympics. He was named the 1973 Greek Athlete of the Year.

References

1948 births
Living people
Athletes (track and field) at the 1972 Summer Olympics
Greek male high jumpers
Olympic athletes of Greece
Athletes from Thessaloniki